The 2011 FIBA Asia Championship for Women was the qualifying tournament for FIBA Asia at the women's basketball tournament at the 2012 Summer Olympics at London. The tournament was held in Omura, Japan from August 21 to August 28.

The championship was divided into two levels: Level I and Level II. The two lowest finishers of Level I met the top two finishers of Level II to determine which teams qualified for the top Level of the 2013 Championship. The losers were relegated to Level II.

Participating teams

Squads

Each team had a roster of maximum twelve players. Only one naturalized player per team was allowed by FIBA.

Preliminary round

Level I

Level II

Qualifying round
Winners are promoted to Level I for the 2013 championships.

Final round

Semifinals

3rd place

Final

Final standing

Awards

Most Valuable Player:  Miao Lijie

All-Star Team:

 PG –  Yuko Oga
 SG –  Choi Youn-Ah
 SF –  Miao Lijie
 PF –  Sin Jung-Ja
 C –  Chen Nan

References

External links
 Official website

 
2009
2011 in women's basketball
women
International women's basketball competitions hosted by Japan
B